Mariann Horváth (born 23 September 1968) is a Hungarian épée fencer, twice individual world champion and four-time team world champion.

Horváth was one of the first women épée champions after the event was introduced by the International Fencing Federation at the 1988 World Fencing Championships.

She commented fencing at the 2012 Summer Olympics for the Hungarian Television. Her emotional account of Áron Szilágyi's victory in men's sabre drew the ire of radio host Gábor Bochkor, who commented that Horváth became "over-emotional" and that he would've "turned off the mic and slapped her twice". The comment drew criticism and Bochkor later issued an apology, but Horváth dismissed it.

Awards
 Hungarian fencer of the Year (1): 1991, 1992
 Gundel Art award (2012)
 János Sípos award (2016)

References

External links
 Profile at the European Fencing Confederation

Hungarian female épée fencers
Universiade medalists in fencing
1968 births
Living people
Universiade gold medalists for Hungary
Medalists at the 1991 Summer Universiade
Medalists at the 1993 Summer Universiade